Lyria patbaili is a species of sea snail, a marine gastropod mollusk in the family Volutidae, the volutes.

Subspecies
 Lyria patbaili minifusca Bozzetti, 2014
 Lyria patbaili patbaili Bouchet, 1999

Description

Distribution
This marine species occurs off Madagascar.

References

External links
 MNHN. Paris: holotype
 Bouchet, P. (1999). A new Lyria (Gastropoda: Volutidae) from southeastern Madagascar. Nautilus. 113: 1-3.

Volutidae
Gastropods described in 1999